Rennard Cordon Davis (May 23, 1940 – February 2, 2021) was an American anti-war activist who gained prominence in the 1960s. He was one of the Chicago Seven defendants charged for anti-war demonstrations and large-scale protests at the 1968 Democratic National Convention in Chicago. He had a prominent organizational role in the American anti–Vietnam War protest movement of the 1960s.

In the early 1970s, Davis became a follower of Guru Maharaj Ji (Prem Rawat) and his Divine Light Mission. He began to travel as a spiritual lecturer. He also became a venture capitalist, and founded the Foundation for a New Humanity to combine these goals.

Early life
Davis was born in Lansing, Michigan, on May 23, 1940.  His family moved to Berryville, Virginia, when he was in the seventh grade. His father, John, worked in nearby Washington, D.C., including as chief of staff to the Council of Economic Advisers under President Harry S. Truman. His mother, Dorothy, was employed as a schoolteacher. Davis studied at Oberlin College starting in 1958. After graduating, he went on to obtain a master's degree from the University of Illinois.

In the 1960s, Davis became active in the Students for a Democratic Society. He was the National Director of their project of community organizing programs (the Economic Research and Action Project, or ERAP) in Ann Arbor, Michigan. He became increasingly allied with anti-war groups, and helped organize protests and related events before and during the 1968 Democratic National Convention in Chicago for the National Mobilization Committee to End the War in Vietnam ("the Mobe").

Democratic Convention protests and subsequent trial

Davis was one of the principal organizers of the National Mobilization Committee to End the War in Vietnam to plan anti-war protests at the 1968 Democratic National Convention. He negotiated unsuccessfully to gain a permit with Chicago city counsel David Stahl.
 At a police riot in Grant Park on August 27, 1968, Davis was among protesters beaten by Chicago police officers, and he suffered a concussion.

The Chicago Eight (later known as the Chicago Seven) were eight men charged with conspiracy, inciting to riot, and other charges related to the nonviolent and violent protests that took place in Chicago. The original eight protester/defendants, as indicted by the grand jury on March 20, 1969, included Davis, Abbie Hoffman, Jerry Rubin, David Dellinger, Tom Hayden, John Froines, Lee Weiner, and Bobby Seale, a Black Panther leader.

During the early part of the trial, Seale's case was separated from the others.  The Chicago Seven defense attorneys were William Kunstler and Leonard Weinglass of the Center for Constitutional Rights. The judge was Julius Hoffman. The prosecutors were Richard Schultz and Tom Foran. The trial began on September 24, 1969. On October 9, the Illinois National Guard was called in to join the Chicago police for crowd control, as demonstrations grew outside the courtroom.  Davis was found guilty of inciting to riot and sentenced to five years imprisonment.  His conviction was overturned on appeal.

At his testimony, given January 23, 1970, Davis related, for the Court, a speech he gave at the University of Chicago on November 20, 1967, and, by extension, his reasons for demonstrating at the Democratic National Convention. The suppression of his testimony led the defense to motion for a mistrial. During his speech, Davis held up a small green steel ball, about the size of a tennis ball, and described how 640 of them were dropped by an American F-105 fighter jet over Nam Ding, Vietnam. 

Foran objected that the methods and techniques used during the Vietnam war had nothing to do with whether or not people in the United States had a right to travel in interstate commerce to incite a riot. The Court sustained the objection and Kunstler motioned for a mistrial.

Divine Light Mission
In the early 1970s, Davis became a follower of Guru Maharaj Ji (Prem Rawat). He was a spokesperson and speaker at the widely publicized Millennium '73 event organized by Divine Light Mission in the Houston Astrodome. He described the arrival of Guru Maharaj Ji as,  Texas Monthly quoted Davis as stating: "This city is going to be remembered through all the ages of human civilization." An op-ed in the San Francisco Sunday Examiner speculated at the time as to whether Davis had undergone a lobotomy, and suggested, "If not, maybe he should try one."

Foundation for a New Humanity
Davis later became a venture capitalist and lecturer on meditation and self-awareness. He created the Foundation for a New Humanity, a technology development and venture capital company commercializing breakthrough technologies.

He appeared on Larry King Live, Barbara Walters, CNN, Phil Donahue, VH1, and other network television programs. He consulted and provided advice in business strategies for Fortune 500 companies.

Davis returned to Chicago for the 1996 Democratic National Convention to speak at the "Festival of Life" in Grant Park. He also appeared on a panel with activist Tom Hayden discussing "a progressive counterbalance to the religious right".

In a 2005 article published in the Iowa Source, Davis said:

Death 
Davis died on February 2, 2021, at his home in Berthoud, Colorado. He was 80 and suffered from lymphoma, which was discovered only two weeks prior to his death.

Popular culture
 Robert Carradine played Rennie Davis in the 1987 film Conspiracy: The Trial of the Chicago 8.
 Davis voices himself in the 2007 animated documentary Chicago 10.
 In the 2010 film The Chicago 8 Davis was played by Bret Harrison.
 Alex Sharp portrayed Davis in the 2020 drama film The Trial of the Chicago 7.

See also
 New Left
 List of peace activists
 Yippies

Notes and references

Further reading
 Edited by Mark L. Levine, George C. McNamee and Daniel Greenberg / Foreword by Aaron Sorkin. The Trial of the Chicago 7: The Official Transcript. New York: Simon & Schuster, 2020.  
 Edited with an introduction by Jon Wiener. Conspiracy in the Streets: The Extraordinary Trial of the Chicago Seven. Afterword by Tom Hayden and drawings by Jules Feiffer. New York: The New Press, 2006. 
 Edited by Judy Clavir and John Spitzer. The Conspiracy Trial: The extended edited transcript of the trial of the Chicago Eight. Complete with motions, rulings, contempt citations, sentences and photographs. Introduction by William Kunstler and foreword by Leonard Weinglass. Indianapolis: Bobbs-Merrill Company, 1970. . 
 Schultz, John. The Conspiracy Trial of the Chicago Seven. Foreword by Carl Oglesby. Chicago: University of Chicago Press, 2020. . (Originally published in 1972 as Motion Will Be Denied.)
 Chatfield, Charles, "At the Hands of Historians: The Antiwar Movement of the Vietnam Era", Peace & Change, Volume 29 Issue 3–4 p. 483. July 2004 
 Johns, Andrew L. "Northern Passage: American Vietnam War Resisters in Canada", Journal of Cold War Studies. Volume 5, Number 2, Spring 2003, pp. 86–89
 Greenfield, Robert. The Spiritual Supermarket. Saturday Review Press/E. P. Dutton & Co. Inc, New York. 1975

External links

 Video preview, 1974, Independent Video Archive (mediaburn.org), Lord of the Universe (documentary), Rennie Davis featured in clips
 3-minute excerpt, Creative Commons License, Internet Archive
 The Chicago Seven
 The Chicago Seven Trial
 UMKC Law site on Chicago Seven
 with Rennie Davis by Stephen McKiernan, Binghamton University Libraries Center for the Study of the 1960s, October 10, 2009

1940 births
2021 deaths
20th-century American businesspeople
American anti–Vietnam War activists
Businesspeople from Lansing, Michigan
Chicago Seven
Deaths from cancer in Colorado
Deaths from lymphoma
Oberlin College alumni
People from Berryville, Virginia
Prem Rawat
People from Berthoud, Colorado